Angie Hatton (born October 28, 1972) is an American politician who served in the Kentucky House of Representatives, representing the 94th district from 2017 to 2023. In the 2022 elections, Hatton was defeated by Republican Jacob Justice.

References

External links

1972 births
Living people
Democratic Party members of the Kentucky House of Representatives
People from Whitesburg, Kentucky
21st-century American politicians
Women state legislators in Kentucky
21st-century American women politicians